Georgi Mikhailovich Gongadze (born 20 March 1996) is a Russian professional footballer who plays as a forward for FC Fakel Voronezh.

Career
He made his debut in the Russian Professional Football League for PFC Dynamo Stavropol on 12 March 2017, in a game against FC Biolog-Novokubansk. He played the full match.

As a member of FC SKA Rostov-on-Don, he became one of the top scorers in the Russian Professional Football League, scoring 17 goals.

He made his debut in the Russian Football National League for FC Torpedo Moscow on 10 July 2021 in a game against FC Kuban Krasnodar.

On 1 June 2022, Gongadze signed with FC Fakel Voronezh, newly promoted to Russian Premier League. He made his RPL debut for Fakel on 17 July 2022 against FC Krasnodar.

Career statistics

References

External links
 
 Profile by Russian Professional Football League
 Profile by Russian Football National League

1996 births
Russian sportspeople of Georgian descent
Footballers from Moscow
Living people
Russian footballers
Association football forwards
FC Olimp-Dolgoprudny players
FC Dynamo Stavropol players
FC Mashuk-KMV Pyatigorsk players
FC SKA Rostov-on-Don players
FC Torpedo Moscow players
FC SKA-Khabarovsk players
FC Fakel Voronezh players
Russian Premier League players
Russian First League players
Russian Second League players